How It Should Have Ended (HISHE) is an animated web series that parodies popular films by creating alternate endings and pointing out various flaws. Endings for many major movies have been presented, using the tagline "sometimes movies don't finish the way we'd like."

History 

How It Should Have Ended began after Daniel Baxter and Tommy Watson started discussing alternate endings for a movie they had watched. In 2005 their first animation "How Star Wars Should Have Ended" was completed and soon after in July 2005 the website was established. Christina "Tina" Alexander, who has previously worked with Daniel, joined the team shortly thereafter.

HISHE was awarded the "Best Internet Parody" award for How Superman Should Have Ended by Spike TV at the 2006 Scream Awards at the Pantages Theater Hollywood, California. and was featured in an MTV Comedy and Talent Showcase at the Hollywood Improv.  It has also been featured as a Yahoo! Profile Pick and has appeared in both Fade In and Wired magazines.

On March 5, 2007, HISHE was launched on YouTube as HISHEdotcom. It has attracted notable appearances such as Stan Lee himself in the parody of The Amazing Spider-Man.

In September 2009 How It Should Have Ended joined Starz Digital Media which now handles all licensing. In April 2010, How It Should Have Ended was awarded the Streamy Award for Best Animated Web Series at the Orpheum Theatre in Los Angeles.

On June 30, 2013, a video was uploaded on TheFineBros channel which features the Teens React teens watching the Lord of the Rings, Harry Potter, and The Hunger Games HISHE Videos.

In November 2013, Batman and Superman from "Super Cafe" guest starred in the Nostalgia Critic's review of Man of Steel, at the end of the episode where The Critic parodies Super Cafe. HISHE also featured in the Screen Junkies series Honest Trailers in the episodes about The Hobbit: The Battle of the Five Armies and Star Trek Into Darkness, with HISHE in turn inviting members of Screen Junkies onboard as guest writers.

Statistics 
As of May 7, 2022, HISHE had 10.3 million subscribers and more than 3.1 billion views. At the same time, HISHE had amassed over 284,000 likes on its Facebook account, over 126,000 followers on its Instagram account and over 30,000 followers on its Twitter account.

Running gags
The series features running gags, including, but not limited to:
 In the "Super Cafe" segments, Batman and Superman discuss the actions of characters in current or upcoming movies, to which Batman almost always says he can do them better “Because I’m Batman!”
 In Star Wars episodes (and on rare instances, episodes based on other films such as Guardians of the Galaxy Vol. 2) Darth Vader (or some variation of Anakin Skywalker depending on the era) gets overly giddy and excited when he finds out about his descendants or when someone's lineage is revealed, much to the chagrin of those around him.
 In episodes themed around Captain America films, the characters tease Captain America by singing a parody of his theme song from The Marvel Super Heroes, bringing up everything that did not surrender to him in the MCU up to that point.
 This was further referenced in the episode for Avengers: Endgame when Steve did it to Falcon after passing the mantle, and in the episode for The Falcon and the Winter Soldier, by Sam and Bucky after John Walker, the government appointed Captain America, lost the shield after one of the Dora Milaje stole it.
 Characters frequently tend to reference or parody other characters played by the same actors as them. For instance, in any film featuring a character played by actor Andy Serkis (i.e. Supreme Leader Snoke from Star Wars sequel trilogy, Ulysses Klaue from the Marvel Cinematic Universe, etc.), the parody features the character with the voice of Gollum from The Lord of the Rings film series, Serkis' best known film role.
 In alternate endings where certain characters survive movies they would've died in (e.g. Quicksilver in Avengers: Age of Ultron, Polka-Dot Man in The Suicide Squad, Aunt May in Spider-Man: No Way Home and Gilgamesh in Eternals) said character says "One of us might have died" in the aftermath.

Critical reception 
Tubefilter ran an article covering How It Should Have Ended and discussing its fanbase.

HISHE parodies

Movies, TV & video games

HISHE Remastered

Bonus and extended scenes

HISHE Dubs

HISHE Reviews

HISHE Features 

On May 12, 2015, HISHE launched a series named 'HISHE Features'. This series aims to put the spotlight on lesser known YouTube animators or movie related channels. It is also used to bridge the gap between HISHE's own videos.

The series has been a success, both in terms of views and features, which include Ricepirate, OnlyLeigh, BrotherhoodWorkshop as well as Hank and Jed. The series has however received some criticism from fans who believe the content is not up to par with HISHE's own and could therefore damage their reputation. HISHE has responded by refuting these claims stating that it is beneficial to all parties involved.

BrotherhoodWorkshop

Movie Mash

Total Spoilage

After Credits

Five Stages of Watching

Hero Swap

James Covenant

ByteSize Recaps

Others

HISHE Kids 
HISHE launched an additional channel called HISHE Kids, with the show Fixed Fairy Tales.

Fixed Fairy Tales 
Fixed Fairy Tales is an animated series that takes classic fairy tales and gives them a new twist. The stories are narrated by a talking owl named Vincent Featherbottom, who usually tells a summary to the actual story while pointing some flaws and starts to narrate his own version of the story.

Super Cafe / Villain's Pub 

The Super Cafe / Villain's Pub is a segment that debuted at the end of How Superman Should Have Ended which featured Superman discussing the alternate events of the 1978 Superman film in a cafe with Batman, which began the trend of the Super Cafe. Though it is thought to be based on Seinfeld, the clips are actually based on the final scene of Daniel Baxter's favorite film, Swingers, with Superman standing in for Trent and Batman standing in for Mike.

In various superhero episodes of How it Should have Ended, altered or added scenes are shown from the superhero film, followed by the superheroes that appear in the movie interacting with Batman and Superman (both voiced by Daniel Baxter) in the Super Cafe; it also always appears at the end of each episode (except the HISHE videos for Sam Raimi's Spider-Man trilogy, which the Cafe was only shown at the near beginning). The Super Cafe segment is featured in every superhero film the series has covered so far. Superman and Batman also make a brief appearance in a cafe in the How Pulp Fiction Should Have Ended. The segment was also used in the Nostalgia Critic's review of Man of Steel. A companion segment called the "Villain Pub" which is modeled from Cheers and features many popular villains like Loki, the Joker, Voldemort, General Zod and many more began with How Thor: The Dark World Should Have Ended. In those segments, Emperor Palpatine is the bartender, Bowser is the bouncer (bownser), Thanos is the janitor, HAL 9000 is the security system and Jaws is the executioner. The Cheers Theme Song was rewritten as a theme.

There are numerous running gags in the Super Cafe segments, the most notable being in which Batman always explains his various accomplishments and abilities or finds some kind of excuse to say his catchphrase "Because I'm Batman!", much to Superman's irritation. In the Suicide Squad HISHE, Batman discovers the Villain Pub and in the Villain Pub episode "Boss Battle", goes to confront the villains congregating there, nearly successfully, only to be tempted by Emperor Palpatine by his weakness – the ladies. It is then that Harley Quinn, who had used her vexing charms to be allowed back into the pub, knocks out Batman from behind. Batman is then taken into the cellar to be fed to the shark Jaws, who is comically depicted as talking in a high-pitched voice, chained up and stripped of his equipment. He barely escapes after being rescued by Dr. Strange, a fact that is reiterated in the Doctor Strange HISHE (which also cryptically contained a spoiler for the Avengers: Infinity War trailer). Later, in the Guardians of the Galaxy Vol. 2 HISHE, things begin to take a turn for the dire when Ayesha, disgusted by heroes congregating in a cafe to meet, decides to punish superheroes whom she blames for her failure by destroying their cafe and unleashes her superweapon Martha (a parody of Adam Warlock, who was teased in the actual end-credits scene of Guardians of the Galaxy Vol. 2, and deliberately named to taunt both Batman and Superman for their mothers having the same name). The arrival of Martha to decimate the cafe is foreshadowed in further videos like the Wonder Woman, Spider-Man: Homecoming and Thor: Ragnarok HISHE videos. At last, in the Justice League HISHE video, Martha (voiced by James Rallison) arrives and succeeds in his primary objective of destroying the cafe but upon facing the Justice League, joined by Green Lantern, who comically resembles Steve Trevor, gets his neck snapped by Superman, much to the irritation of Batman, who had wanted to take down Martha through his own plan. The cafe is later rebuilt by Black Panther in the Black Panther HISHE video.

In the HISHE video for Deadpool, Deadpool gets himself bounced from both the Super Cafe and the Villain Pub. He gets bounced from the Super Cafe because he likes killing enemies like a villain, and from the Villain Pub because he is not evil enough to be allowed there. Deadpool can't even swear at the Pub, with his attempts being given bleep censors.

Super Cafe episodes 
Note: Each episode features Superman and Batman.

Villain Pub episodes 
Note: Each episode features patrons the Joker, Loki, General Zod, Lord Voldemort and bartender Palpatine. Some times janitor Thanos and Khan make an appearance in some episodes.

See also 
 Honest Trailers
 CinemaSins

Notes

References

External links 

HISHEdotcom on YouTube
Video of the Streamy Awards presentation for Best Animated Web Series
Writer of Pop: Website of the week: How it Should Have Ended

Parodies of films
Streamy Award-winning channels, series or shows
2005 web series debuts
Crossover animation
Crossover television
Adult comedy web series
Adult animated web series
American adult animated web series
American adult animated comedy television series
American comedy web series
YouTube channels launched in 2005
2000s YouTube series
2010s YouTube series
2020s YouTube series
Comedy YouTubers